Lower Arrernte, also known as Lower Southern Arrernte, Lower Aranda, Lower Southern Aranda and Alenjerntarrpe, was an Arandic language (but not of the Arrernte language group). Lower Arrernte was spoken in the Finke River area, near the Overland Telegraph Line station at Charlotte Waters, just north of the border between South Australia and the Northern Territory, and in the Dalhousie area in S.A. It had been extinct since the last speaker died in 2011, but there is now a language revival project under way.

Extinction
By 2007 only one person was known to speak it fluently enough to hold a conversation: Brownie Doolan Perrurle (1918–2011), known as Brownie Doolan. Gavan Breen, an Australian linguist, was able to compile a dictionary of Lower Arrernte comprising about a thousand words by recording talks he had with Doolan.

Doolan's mother Fanny, father Paddy and grandmother, who lived south of the small settlement at Finke/Aputula in the Northern Territory, near Mt Dare in South Australia, spoke the language. After a stint as a stockman on the Andado station in the mid-1940s, Doolan became a tracker for both Finke and Kulgera police. Doolan and his wife Biddy are recorded in 1960s censuses of Finke, with Brownie recorded as a tracker, and of the Purula group of Aranda people. When Doolan died in 2011, the language was rendered extinct.

Language revival

, Lower Southern Arrernte is one of 20 languages prioritised as part of the Priority Languages Support Project, being undertaken by First Languages Australia and funded by the Department of Communications and the Arts. The project aims to "identify and document critically-endangered languages — those languages for which little or no documentation exists, where no recordings have previously been made, but where there are living speakers".

References 

Arandic languages
Endangered indigenous Australian languages in the Northern Territory